Landforms are categorized by characteristic physical attributes such as their creating process, shape, elevation, slope, orientation, rock exposure, and soil type.

Landforms by process

Landforms organized by the processes that create them.

Aeolian landforms
s are formed by the wind and include:

Coastal and oceanic landforms

Coastal and oceanic landforms include:

 

, and stump

Cryogenic landforms

Erosion landforms
Landforms produced by erosion and weathering usually occur in coastal or fluvial environments, and many also appear under those headings.

 

Paleoplain - A buried erosion plain; a particularly large and flat erosion surface

Fluvial landforms
 landforms include:

Impact landforms
Landforms created by  – include:

Lacustrine landforms
Lacustrine – associated with lakes – landforms include:

Mountain and glacial landforms
Mountain and  – include:

 formed by glacial movement 

 or cwm

 and

Slope landforms
Slope landforms include:

Tectonic landforms
Landforms created by tectonic activity include:

Volcanic landforms
Volcanic landforms include:

Weathering landforms
Weathering landforms include:

 

 (Weathering pit)

Landforms by shape

Positive landforms

Depressions

Flat landforms

Paleoplain - A buried erosion plain; a particularly large and flat erosion surface

Landforms, alphabetic

 

 or cwm

 (scarp)

, natural

 

 

Paleoplain - A buried erosion plain; a particularly large and flat erosion surface 

 (salt flat)

 and stump

Further reading 
Hargitai H., Kereszturi Á. (eds): Encyclopedia of Planetary Landforms. Springer. https://link.springer.com/referencework/10.1007/978-1-4614-3134-3

See also
 
 Types of bodies of water
 
 

Landforms
 
Landforms